This is a list of titles used by dictators, authoritarian political leaders. Various authoritarian political leaders in various official positions assumed, formally or not, similar titles suggesting the power to speak for the nation itself. Most commonly the title is a form of "leader" or "guide", such as "Supreme Leader". See dictatorship.

Before the Second World War

Some of the titles used by dictators before World War II were:

The style Vozhd, meaning Chief, was conferred to George Karađorđe Petrović for his nationalistic leadership in the uprising against the Ottomans on 1804.
The Paraguayan President José Gaspar Rodríguez de Francia used, among other titles, El Supremo (The Supreme) and Dictador Perpetuo (Perpetual Dictator).

In the 1940s and parts of the 1950s

Such titles used by heads of state and/or government during the Second World War include:

 Führer ("leader" or "guide") Adolf Hitler, from 1934 to 1945, dictator of Germany (formally "Führer and Reich Chancellor").
 Führer und Lehrer Joseph Stalin, late 1940s in East Germany 
 Vozhd ("leader") Joseph Stalin, dictator of Soviet Union has also been referred to as Father of Nations, "Great Leader",  "General Secretary", "Generalisimus", "The Man of Steel", "Brilliant Genius of Humanity", "Great Architect of Communism", "Gardener of Human Happiness", "Dear Father".
 Duce (from Latin dux meaning "guide") Benito Mussolini, from 1925 to 1943 dictator of Italy (formally "Head of Government").
 Vodca ("Leader") monsignor Jozef Tiso, from 1942 self-styled, in Slovakia, President 1939–1945 (acting to 26 October 1939).
 Conducător ("leader"), a title used by Ion Antonescu and Nicolae Ceaușescu in Romania.
 El Caudillo de España ("the Chieftain of Spain") Generalísimo Francisco Franco Bahamonde, Jefe de Estado (Chief of State) and "Chief of Government" (Prime Minister). He adopted this title for himself and came to power after winning the Spanish Civil War. During World War II he maintained the neutrality of Spain. In fact the titles of Franco and Salazar (in Portugal) were used officially and rather than personally (cf: "mein führer" or "mio duce" my fuhrer and my duce). It is alleged that it was often used as a protocolary title; preceded with By the Grace of God it would indicate that the Spanish People had been luckily spared from the Soviet invasion.
 "Marszałek" (marshal) Józef Piłsudski, dictator of Poland from 1926 to 1935.
 Poglavnik Nezavisne Države Hrvatske ("Chief of the Independent State of Croatia") Ante Pavelić, leader of the Nazi-Fascist Italy puppet government in Croatia.
 Fører ("leader", "guide") Vidkun Quisling, (formally Minister-president), premier of the Nazi puppet government in Norway, and after Reichskommissar Josef Terboven the highest official in occupied Norway, reporting directly to Adolf Hitler.
 Leider ("leader"), a title used by Anton Mussert, the leader of Nationaal-Socialistische Beweging (National Socialist Movement) in the Netherlands. Though styled "leader" under the German occupation, he was not a real dictator as he had little actual power. In fact Arthur Seyss-Inquart was in charge of the Netherlands on behalf of the Nazi regime.
 Maréchal ("Marshal") - Between 1940 and 1944, when Marshal Philippe Pétain was Chief of the French State (Vichy France), the name for his military rank became synonymous with Pétain. Though the country retained the Marseillaise as its national anthem, Maréchal, nous voilà ! was widely seen as the alternative Vichy French anthem.
 Nemzetvezető ("leader of the nation"), a title used by Ferenc Szálasi, the chief of the Nyilaskeresztes Párt (Arrow Cross Party) who succeeded Miklós Horthy in Hungary.
 Arhigos ("chief" or "leader"), a title used by General Ioannis Metaxas of Greece's 4th of August Regime.
 Adipati ("chief of state" or "generalissimo"), the title used by Ba Maw of the Japanese satellite State of Burma
 Udhëheqësi [i partisë dhe i popullit] ynë i madh, Our great guide [of the party and of the people], the most common title used by Albanian communist dictator Enver Hoxha.
 Or even simply President as did for example, Getúlio Vargas of Brazil, from 1930 to 1945 as well as the generals during the 1964–1985 regime.

Other 'leaders' of contemporary political groups who never achieved power:
 Capitanul 'The Captain' Corneliu Zelea Codreanu of the "Iron Guard" in Romania.
 El Jefe 'The Chief' Jorge González von Marées of the Chilean Nacistas (Chilean Spanish word for "Nazis"), who failed a coup d'état in 1938.

 Vozhd 'Leader' Konstantin Rodzaevsky of the Russian Fascist Party, only active in exile in Manchuria, most admired Mussolini but saw action only in the anti-Communist service of the Japanese Empire.
 the American Führer Fritz Kuhn of the German American Bund.
 Chief William Dudley Pelley of the U.S. Silver Legion of America.
 Adrien Arcand, self-proclaimed Canadian Führer of the Canadian National Unity Party.
 Tindis or Tandis (leader of a confederation of barangays) used by the Sakdalista Party leader Benigno Ramos during the Commonwealth of the Philippines, under United States sovereignty.

In areas occupied by the Axis powers, some states or ethnic-cultural communities aspiring to national self-determination found they were not handed real power by their victorious German allies as they had hoped. Their nationalist leaders, too weak to gain control independently, were simply used as pawns.

Such Nazi collaborators include De Leider "leader" Staf De Clercq of the VNV (Flemish National League) in Flanders (the Dutch-speaking northern majority of Belgium), who had dreamed of a 'Diets' nation uniting Flanders, the Netherlands and Frans-Vlaanderen (the French part of historic Flanders, united with Belgium into one military occupation zone and Reichskommissariat). Even when the Germans decided in December 1944, after the Allied breakthrough, to carve up Belgium, leaving only bicultural capital Brussels under the Reichskommissar, the post of Landsleider van het Vlaamsche Volk ('Land leader of the Flemish people') of the new Reichsgau (integral 'Germanic' part of the Reich, in this case merely on paper) (Flandern, Vlaanderen in Dutch; capital Anwerp) went to another collaborating party, Devlag, in the person of Jef Van de Wiele (1902–1979), 15 December 1944 – 1945, in exile in Germany as the Allies controlled all Belgium since September 1944; meanwhile in the French-speaking south of Belgium, partially reconquered by the Wehrmacht (December 1944 – January 1945), the equivalent post of Chef du Peuple Wallon ('Leader of the Walloon People'), at the head of the Reichsgau Wallonien, went to Léon Degrelle (in exile in Germany) of the Belgicist Rex Party.

Postwar era and the Cold War 

In the post-war era, dictatorship became a frequent feature of military government, especially in Latin America, Asia, and Africa. In the case of many African or Asian former colonies, after achieving their independence in the postwar wave of decolonization, presidential regimes were gradually transformed into personal dictatorships. These regimes often proved unstable, with the personalization of power in the hands of the dictator and his associates, making the political system uncertain.

During the Cold War, both the U.S. and the USSR managed to expand or maintain their influence zones by financing paramilitary and political groups and encouraging coups d'état that have led many countries to brutal civil wars and consequent manifestations of authoritarianism. In Latin America, the fear of either communism or socialism was often used as justification for dictatorship.

Individual cases 

Idi Amin's official title while in office as President of Uganda was 'His Excellency, President for Life, Field Marshal Al Hadji Doctor Idi Amin Dada, VC, DSO, MC, Lord of All the Beasts of the Earth and Fishes of the Seas and Conqueror of the British Empire in Africa in General and Uganda in Particular'. He also claimed to be the uncrowned King of Scotland.
In the North Korean hereditary system, Kim Il-sung and Kim Jong-il used the titles Great Leader and Dear Leader respectively. Kim Jong-un uses Supreme Leader as his title.
Muammar Gaddafi, once de facto Libyan head of state, used the title "Guide of the First of September Great Revolution of the Socialist People's Libyan Arab Jamahiriya" and "Brotherly Leader and Guide of the Revolution".
In Romania, Communist Party leader and President Nicolae Ceaușescu even had the same title, Conducător (Romanian for leader), as earlier dictator Marshal Ion Antonescu.
U.S.-backed Indonesian president Suharto was awarded the title of "Father of Development" by the Golkar and Armed Forces-controlled Parliament in 1983.
Saparmurat Niyazov, the late president for life of the Republic of Turkmenistan, and former leader of the Turkmen Communist Party and later of the Democratic Party of Turkmenistan (the country's only political party), assumed from 22 October 1993 the unique, paternalistic national title Turkmenbashi (Türkmenbaşy in Turkmen), which means "Head of (all) the Turkmens".
In Mali, Moussa Traoré gave himself the title President for Life, but was deposed in 1991.
Pakistani general Pervez Musharraf, called himself "chief executive" after 1999 coup.

References

Dictatorship
Political titles
Politics-related lists